Events from the year 1895 in Canada.

Incumbents

Crown 
 Monarch – Victoria

Federal government 
 Governor General – John Hamilton-Gordon 
 Prime Minister – Mackenzie Bowell
 Chief Justice of Canada – Samuel Henry Strong (Ontario)
 Parliament – 7th

Provincial governments

Lieutenant governors 
Lieutenant Governor of British Columbia – Edgar Dewdney 
Lieutenant Governor of Manitoba – John Christian Schultz (until September 2) then James Colebrooke Patterson
Lieutenant Governor of New Brunswick – John James Fraser 
Lieutenant Governor of Nova Scotia – Malachy Bowes Daly   
Lieutenant Governor of Ontario – George Airey Kirkpatrick 
Lieutenant Governor of Prince Edward Island – George William Howlan
Lieutenant Governor of Quebec – Joseph-Adolphe Chapleau

Premiers    
Premier of British Columbia – Theodore Davie (until March 4) then John Herbert Turner 
Premier of Manitoba – Thomas Greenway 
Premier of New Brunswick – Andrew George Blair  
Premier of Nova Scotia – William Stevens Fielding  
Premier of Ontario – Oliver Mowat    
Premier of Prince Edward Island – Frederick Peters 
Premier of Quebec – Louis-Olivier Taillon

Territorial governments

Lieutenant governors 
 Lieutenant Governor of Keewatin – John Christian Schultz (until September 2) then James Colebrooke Patterson
 Lieutenant Governor of the North-West Territories – Charles Herbert Mackintosh

Premiers 
 Chairman of the Executive Committee of the North-West Territories – Frederick Haultain

Events
March – Maria Grant is the first woman in Canada to be elected to any office.  She served six years on the Victoria School Board and was presented to the future George V as the only woman elected as a school trustee in Canada.
March 2 – Theodore Davie resigns as premier of British Columbia
March 4 – John Herbert Turner becomes premier of British Columbia 
April 24 – Jean-Olivier Chénier Monument unveiled 
July 1 – Maisonneuve Monument unveiled 
October 2 – Additional provisional districts of the North-West Territories are established: the districts of Ungava, Mackenzie, Yukon, and Franklin. The districts of Keewatin and Athabaska are enlarged so that all points of Canada are either within a province or a district.
The Chinese Board of Trade is formed in Vancouver
First ascent of Mount Hector in Banff National Park.

Sport  
March 9 – The Montreal Hockey Club wins their second Stanley Cup by defeating Queen's University 5 goals to 1 at Montreal's Victoria Rink

Births

January to June
February 1 – Conn Smythe, ice hockey manager and owner (d.1980)
February 15 – Earl Thomson, athlete and Olympic gold medallist (d.1971)
March 23 – John Robert Cartwright, jurist and Chief Justice of Canada (d.1979)
April 30 – Philippe Panneton, physician, academic, diplomat and writer (d.1960)
May 12 – William Giauque, chemist and Nobel laureate (d.1982)
May 27 – Douglas Lloyd Campbell, politician and 13th Premier of Manitoba (d.1995)

July to December

July 7 – Thane Campbell, jurist, politician and Premier of Prince Edward Island (d.1978)
July 29 – Albert A. Brown, politician and lawyer (d.1971)
September 7 – Pete Parker, radio announcer (d.1991)
September 18 – John Diefenbaker, politician and 13th Prime Minister of Canada (d.1979)
September 20 – Leslie Frost, politician and 16th Premier of Ontario (d.1973)
November 5 – Howard Charles Green, politician and Minister (d.1989)
December 1 – Edwin Hansford, politician (d.1959)

Deaths
January 17 – Joseph Tassé, politician (b.1848)
January 28 – Camille Lefebvre (b.1831)
April 4 – Malcolm Alexander MacLean, 1st Mayor of Vancouver (b.1842)
August 4 – Louis-Antoine Dessaulles, seigneur, journalist and politician (b.1818)
September 4 – Antoine Plamondon, artist (b.1804)
September 11 – Thomas Heath Haviland, politician (b.1822) 
September 15 – Hector Berthelot, lawyer, journalist and publisher (b.1842)

Historical documents

Liberal Party of Canada pamphlet comments on economic conditions

Maria Grant, elected to Victoria, B.C. school board, hopes next election will return two more women

Medical education of women, and how to answer objections to it

Dominion's Indian Head farm sees trees leafed out by May 1 (3 weeks early), but fruit destroyed by 18° Fahrenheit (-7° Celsius) cold snap

Report on domestication of Barren Grounds caribou

Toronto Trades and Labor Council supports continued restriction of Chinese immigration

References 

 
Years of the 19th century in Canada
Canada
1895 in North America